George Alan Cohon,  (born April 19, 1937) is an American-born Canadian businessman who is the founder and senior chairman of McDonald's Canada and McDonald's Russia.

Early life and education
George Alan Cohon was born to a Ukrainian-Jewish father and an American-Jewish mother in Chicago, Illinois. His father worked as a lawyer and later a baker. He grew up in Chicago sharing a bedroom alongside his older sister Sandy. He received a B.Sc. from Drake University and a Juris Doctor degree from the Northwestern University School of Law. While at Northwestern, he met his future wife Susan.

Career

Cohon practiced corporate law in Chicago from 1961 through 1967 at his father's law firm before moving to Toronto, Ontario, as the licensee of McDonald's Corporation for Eastern Canada. He opened his first McDonald's location in London Ontario on November 11, 1968. On the day of the opening, McDonald's founder Ray Kroc offered to buy Cohon's licence for $1 million. He later became chairman, president and chief executive officer of McDonald's Restaurants of Canada. By 1976, Cohon presided over 200 McDonald locations. In 1982, Cohon and 20 corporate sponsors helped save the Toronto Santa Claus Parade, which was sponsored by Eaton's department stores from 1905 to 1981. He grew his McDonald franchise by himself until 1971, when McDonald's bought him out with stock. Cohon eventually became a Canadian citizen in 1975.

In 1988, Cohon was appointed to sit on the board of the Royal Bank of Canada and Director of the Board of Astral Inc and Toronto Sun Publishing Corporation.

He was involved in opening McDonald's in the former Soviet Union with the first restaurant opening in Moscow on January 31, 1990. He was subsequently named Russia's "Capitalist Hero of Labor." The first restaurant was at the time McDonald's biggest, and was opened with minimal involvement from the U.S. parent company, for political reasons. It accepted only Russian rubles, not hard currency, and in the early days, the line to enter the restaurant could be several hours long. Due to Soviet supply shortages, the company created its own supply chain in the Soviet Union, including farms and packaging. At the 1991 G7 Summit in London, Canadian Prime Minister Brian Mulroney (Cohon's personal friend) personally complained to Mikhail Gorbachev about the difficulties Cohon was experiencing doing business in the Soviet Union.

Businessperson Craig Cohon, son of George and Susan, helped bring Coca-Cola to Russia.

He is also the founder of Ronald McDonald House Charities, which provides accommodation for families whose children are receiving medical treatment, in Canada and in Russia.

Awards and honours

In 1988, he was made a Member of the Order of Canada. In 1998, he was awarded the Order of Friendship by the Russian government.

He was awarded the Order of Ontario in 2000. In 2012, he received a key to the city of Toronto.

In 2019 he was promoted within the Order of Canada to the highest grade of Companion by Governor General Julie Payette. This will give him the Post Nominal Letters "CC" for Life.

On 14 June 2011, he was awarded the Honorary degree of Doctor of Laws (LL.D) by Simon Fraser University.

As a recipient of the Order of Canada He has also received The 125th Anniversary of the Confederation of Canada Medal in 1992, The Canadian Version of the Queen Elizabeth II Golden Jubilee Medal in 2002 and the Canadian Version of the Queen Elizabeth II Diamond Jubilee Medal in 2012.

Personal life
His son, Mark Cohon, was the 12th commissioner of the Canadian Football League. In 2000, George Cohon was diagnosed with prostate cancer but fully recovered. In 2004, he was rejected from Toronto's Rosedale Golf Club due to his Jewish heritage. After being taken to court, a Judge ruled this was unlawful.

References

External links

Multimedia
 CBC Archives CBC Television reports on the opening of Moscow McDonald's (1990).

1937 births
Living people
American emigrants to Canada
American people of Ukrainian-Jewish descent
Astral Media people
Businesspeople from Chicago
Businesspeople from Toronto
Canadian chairpersons of corporations
Canadian people of American-Jewish descent
Canadian people of Ukrainian-Jewish descent
Directors of Royal Bank of Canada
Drake University alumni
Northwestern University Pritzker School of Law alumni
McDonald's people
Members of the Order of Ontario
Companions of the Order of Canada